Chaperina is a genus of frogs in the family Microhylidae. It is the only genus in the subfamily Chaperininae. It is also itself monotypic, being represented by the single species, Chaperina fusca, commonly known as the brown thorny frog, spiny-heeled froglet, and saffron-bellied frog. 
It is found on the Malay Peninsula, in Borneo and in the Philippines (Palawan, Mindanao, and Jolo islands). It is abundant in Borneo but uncommon on the Malay Peninsula and patchily distributed in the Philippines.

Description
Chaperina fusca are small frogs: males measure  in snout–vent length and females . They are black above with minute white, light blue, or greenish spots. The skin is smooth with scattered tubercles; they have a sharp dermal projection on elbows and heel.

These frogs are active after rainfall on forest floor and low vegetation; they are good climbers.

Habitat and conservation
Its natural habitats are primary lowland and montane rainforests as well as edge habitats; it has also been found in rural gardens. It breeds in small, temporary water bodies rich in decaying organic matter.

Threats to this species include deforestation, habitat conversion to agriculture, and pollution.

References

External links
 Sound recordings of Chaperina fusca at BioAcoustica

Microhylidae
Monotypic amphibian genera
Amphibians described in 1892
Fauna of Brunei
Amphibians of Indonesia
Amphibians of Malaysia
Amphibians of the Philippines
Amphibians of Thailand
Amphibians of Borneo
Taxa named by François Mocquard
Taxonomy articles created by Polbot